Microstigma is a species of damselflies belonging to the family Pseudostigmatidae.

Species
 Microstigma anomalum Rambur, 1842 
 Microstigma maculatum Hagen in Selys, 1860 
 Microstigma rotundatum Selys, 1860

References

Pseudostigmatidae
Zygoptera genera
Odonata of South America
Taxa named by Jules Pierre Rambur